The 1995–96 Iraq FA Cup was the 19th edition of the Iraq FA Cup as a clubs-only competition. The tournament was won by Al-Zawraa for the fourth consecutive time and the 11th time in their history, beating Al-Shorta 2–1 in the final. The previous rounds saw Al-Zawraa beat Al-Shuala 6–0, Salahaddin 6–0, Al-Sulaikh 4–1 and Al-Naft 1–0. Meanwhile, Al-Shorta had eliminated Al-Quwa Al-Jawiya in the semi-finals 4–2 on penalties after Al-Quwa Al-Jawiya had beaten Al-Ramadi 2–1 with a golden goal in the quarter-finals. Al-Zawraa also won the 1995–96 Iraqi Advanced League to complete their third double in a row.

Matches

Final

References

External links
 Iraqi Football Website

Iraq FA Cup
Cup